The Peterborough Summer Festival of Lights, later renamed Peterborough Musicfest, is a non-profit, charitable organization in Peterborough, Ontario, Canada, which hosts a series of free outdoor concerts. In 2015, Peterborough Musicfest was recognized as a Top 100 Festival and Event in Ontario. The concerts are held at Del Crary Park, located in the downtown on George Street, adjacent to Little Lake.

History

Founded in 1986 by Fred Anderson, these concerts were followed by a choreographed illuminated boat show and a fireworks display.

Beginning in 2005, the festival chose to forgo the aging boat show in favour of hiring more well-known performers and improving the fireworks display.  Then in 2009, the fireworks were sacrificed due to cuts to the festival's budget.  The festival board is proposing a name change to "Little Lake MusicFest" by 2010.  Board members want the new name to focus on the music, seeing as the lights are no longer part of the festival.

The festival was later rebranded as "Peterborough Musicfest"
.

Past performers

Serena Ryder
Kiefer Sutherland
I Mother Earth 
Gowan
Hey Rosetta!
The Box
The Spoons
Platinum Blonde
High Valley
Buffy Sainte-Marie
Tegan and Sara
Tebey
Sloan
Hanson
Colin James
54 40
Carly Rae Jepsen
Monkeyjunk
The Proclaimers
Tom Cochrane & Red Rider
April Wine
I Mother Earth
Kalan Porter
Gordon Lightfoot
Natalie MacMaster
Arrogant Worms
Lighthouse (band)
Cowboy Junkies
Beatlemania
Blue Rodeo
Wide Mouth Mason
Emerson Drive
John McDermott
The Trews
Davy Jones
Thousand Foot Krutch
The Stampeders
The Spades
Tommy Hunter
The Leahys
Glass Tiger
Sweet
Lights

External links

Quid Novis - Peterborough Festival of Lights

References

Summer festivals
Festival of Lights, Peterborough Summer
Music festivals in Ontario
Tourist attractions in Peterborough County
Light festivals